This article is part of the history of rail transport by country series

The history of rail transport in Slovenia dates back to 2 June 1846, the opening day of the Graz to Celje section of the Austrian Southern Railway.  The events that day included the inaugural run of the first train to operate in Slovenia.  The difficult and dangerous task of extending the line though challenging terrain to Ljubljana was completed by 1849; the line eventually continued to Trieste, now in Italy.

See also

History of Slovenia
Narrow gauge railways in Slovenia
Slovenske železnice

References

External links
 Enzyklopädie zur Eisenbahngeschichte des Alpen-Donau-Adria-Raumes 

 
Rail transport in Slovenia
Rail transport